This is a list of mayors of Garden Grove, California since its incorporation in 1956.

Elections

2016

2018

Notes
1. Ballard resigned as mayor on April 22, 1969, but remained as a city council member.
2. Barr was appointed mayor upon Ballard's resignation.
3. Schmit served less than seven months as mayor until a motion was voted on by the city council to reorganize, which took place November 3, 1970. Ballard was then re-elected.
4. Cannon resigned on July 17, 1987 due to being appointed a judge for the West Orange County Judicial District by Governor George Deukmejian. Williams was re-elected mayor in a special election in 1987.

References

External links
 - City of Garden Grove

Garden Grove
Government in Orange County, California
M